The Campeonato Argentino de Rugby 1985 was won for the first time by the selection of Tucumán that beat in the final the selection of Buenos Aires

Rugby Union in Argentina in 1985

National
 The selection of Buenos Aires won the "Campeonado de Minores" (Under21 Championship)
 The Buenos Aires Champsionship was won by C.A.S.I.
 The Cordoba Province Championship was won by Tala
 The North-East Championship was won by Los Tarcos

International
 In 1985, Argentina, received two visits of international selections : France and New Zealand.
With France, Argentina draw the series (1 victory both)

With the "All Blacks", the Pumas lost the first test (20-33) but draw the second test.

Preliminaries 
Buenos Aires directly admitted to semifinals

Zone A

Zone B

Interzone A-B

Zone C

Zone D

Semifinals

Final 

Buenos Aires: 15.Bernardo Miguen, 14.Fernando Ibarrola, 13.Marcelo Loffreda, 12. Rafael Madero, 11.Marcelo Campo, 10. Hugo Porta (Cap.), 9.Martín Yanguela, 8.Marcos Giana, 7.Gabriel Traveglini, 6.Marcos Baeck, 5.Roberto Cobello, 4.Joaquín Uriarte, 3.Pablo Devoto, 2.Claudio Granno, 1.Daniel Sanés.
 Tucuman:15.José Ríos, 14.Juan Soler, 13.Gabriel Terán, 12.Alvaro Carrizo, 11.José Gianotti, 10.Lucas Perro, 9.Pedro Merlo, 8.José Santamarina, 7.Marcelo Ricci (Cap.), 6.Pedro Garreton, 5.Roberto De Luce, 4.Sergio Bunader, 3.Ricardo Horte, 2.Ricardo Lefort, 1.Luto Molina.

External Links - Bibliography 
  Memorias de la UAR 1985
  Francesco Volpe, Paolo Pacitti (Author), Rugby 2000, GTE Gruppo Editorale (1999)

Campeonato Argentino de Rugby
Argentina
Campeonato